Heptachlor is an organochlorine compound that was used as an insecticide. Usually sold as a white or tan powder, heptachlor is one of the cyclodiene insecticides.  In 1962, Rachel Carson's Silent Spring questioned the safety of heptachlor and other chlorinated insecticides.  Due to its highly stable structure, heptachlor can persist in the environment for decades. In the United States, the Environmental Protection Agency has limited the sale of heptachlor products to the specific application of fire ant control in underground transformers. The amount that can be present in different foods is regulated.

Synthesis
Analogous to the synthesis of other cyclodienes, heptachlor is produced via the Diels-Alder reaction of hexachlorocyclopentadiene and cyclopentadiene. The resulting adduct is chlorinated followed by treatment with hydrogen chloride in nitromethane in the presence of aluminum trichloride or with iodine monochloride.

Compared to chlordane, it is about 3–5 times more active as an insecticide, but more inert chemically, being resistant to water and caustic alkalies.

Metabolism
Soil microorganisms transform heptachlor by epoxidation, hydrolysis, and reduction. When the compound was incubated with a mixed culture of organisms, chlordene (hexachlorocyclopentadine, its precursor) formed, which was further metabolized to chlordene epoxide. Other metabolites include 1-hydroxychlordene, 1-hydroxy-2,3-epoxychlordene, and heptachlor epoxide. Soil  microorganisms hydrolyze heptachlor to give ketochlordene. Rats metabolize heptachlor to the epoxide 1-exo-1-hydroxyheptachlor epoxide and 1,2-dihydrooxydihydrochlordene. When heptachlor epoxide was incubated with microsomal preparations form liver of pigs and from houseflies, the products found were diol and 1-hydroxy-2,3-epoxychlordene.  The metabolic scheme in rats shows two pathways with the same metabolite. The first involves following scheme: heptachlor → heptachlor epoxide → dehydrogenated derivative of 1-exo-hydroxy-2,3-exo-epoxychlordene → 1,2-dihydrooxydihydrochlordene. The second involves: heptachlor → 1-exo-hydroxychlordene → 1-exo-hydroxy, 2,3-exo-epoxychlordene → 1,2-dihydrooxydihydrochlordene.

Environmental impact
Heptachlor is persistent organic pollutant (POP). It has a half life of ~1.3-4.2 days (air), ~0.03-0.11 years (water), and ~0.11-0.34 years (soil). One study described its half life to be 2 years and claimed that its residues could be found in soil 14 years after its initial application. Like other POPs, heptachlor is lipophilic and poorly soluble in water (0.056 mg/L at 25 °C), thus it tends to accumulate in the body fat of humans and animals. 

Heptachlor epoxide is more likely to be found in the environment than its parent compound. The epoxide also dissolves more easily in water than its parent compound and is more persistent. Heptachlor and its epoxide absorb to soil particles and evaporate.

Toxicity of heptachlor and related derivatives
The range of oral rat  values are 40 mg/kg to 162 mg/kg. Daily oral doses of heptachlor at 50 and 100 mg/kg were found to be lethal to rats after 10 days. For heptachlor epoxide, the oral LD50 values ranging from 46.5 to 60 mg/kg. With rat oral of LD5047mg/kg, heptachlor epoxide is more toxic. A product of hydrogenation of heptachlor, β-dihydroheptachlor, has high insecticidal activity and low mammalian toxicity, rat oral LD50>5,000mg/kg.

Human impact
Humans may be exposed to heptachlor through drinking water and foods, including breast milk. Heptachlor epoxide is derived from a pesticide that was banned in the U.S. in the 1980s. It is still found in soil and water supplies and can turn up in food. It can be passed along in breast milk.

The International Agency for Research on Cancer and the EPA have classified the compound as a possible human carcinogen. Animals exposed to heptachlor epoxide during gestation and infancy are found to have changes in nervous system and immune function. Exposure to higher doses of heptachlor in newborn animals leads to decreased body weight and death.

The U.S. EPA MCL for drinking water is 0.0004 mg/L for heptachlor and 0.0002 mg/L for heptachlor epoxide. The U.S. FDA limit on food crops is 0.01 ppm, in milk 0.1 ppm, and on edible seafoods 0.3 ppm. The Occupational Safety and Health Administration has limit of 0.5 mg/m3 (cubic meter of workplace air) for 8-hour shifts and 40-hour work weeks.

An ATSDR report in 1993 found no studies with respect to death in humans after oral exposure to heptachlor or heptachlor epoxide.

Chemical properties
The octanol-water partition coefficient (Kow) of heptachlor is ~105.27. Henry's Law constant is 2.3 · 10−3atm-m3/mol and the vapor pressure is 3 · 10−4mmHg at 20 °C.

References

External links 
 ASTDR ToxFAQs for Heptachlor
 CDC - NIOSH Pocket Guide to Chemical Hazards
 

Obsolete pesticides
Organochloride insecticides
IARC Group 2B carcinogens
Endocrine disruptors
Persistent organic pollutants under the Stockholm Convention
Persistent organic pollutants under the Convention on Long-Range Transboundary Air Pollution